Rawhitiroa is a locality in South Taranaki, New Zealand. It is approximately 6.5 km east of Eltham.

Demographics

It had a population of 789 at the 2018 New Zealand census, a decrease of 24 people (-3.0%) since the 2013 census, and a decrease of 9 people (-1.1%) since the 2006 census. There were 285 households. There were 411 males and 375 females, giving a sex ratio of 1.1 males per female. The median age was 38.6 years (compared with 37.4 years nationally), with 180 people (22.8%) aged under 15 years, 120 (15.2%) aged 15 to 29, 375 (47.5%) aged 30 to 64, and 111 (14.1%) aged 65 or older.

Ethnicities were 92.0% European/Pākehā, 12.5% Māori, 1.1% Asian, and 1.1% other ethnicities (totals add to more than 100% since people could identify with multiple ethnicities).

The proportion of people born overseas was 7.6%, compared with 27.1% nationally.

Although some people objected to giving their religion, 49.8% had no religion, 40.3% were Christian and 1.1% had other religions.

Of those at least 15 years old, 60 (9.9%) people had a bachelor or higher degree, and 153 (25.1%) people had no formal qualifications. The median income was $34,400, compared with $31,800 nationally. The employment status of those at least 15 was that 327 (53.7%) people were employed full-time, 102 (16.7%) were part-time, and 9 (1.5%) were unemployed.

Marae
The local Ararātā Marae is a tribal meeting ground for the Ngāti Ruanui hapū of Ngāti Hawe.

Education
Rawhitiroa School is a coeducational full primary (years 1-8) school with a roll of  students as of  The school opened on 11 December 1897, and was initially called Andersen Road School. The school was completely destroyed by fire twice, in 1944 and 1976, and rebuilt each time. Mangamingi School, which opened in 1903, was closed and merged with Rawhitiroa School at the end of 1988.

Notes

External links
 Rawhitiroa School website

Populated places in Taranaki
South Taranaki District